Setsuo Kawada (born 3 March 1934) is a Japanese sailor. He competed in the Dragon event at the 1960 Summer Olympics.

References

External links
 

1934 births
Living people
Japanese male sailors (sport)
Olympic sailors of Japan
Sailors at the 1960 Summer Olympics – Dragon
Sportspeople from Tokyo